Comet Tempel may mean:
 Either of these numbered periodic comets:
 9P/Tempel, Comet Tempel 1 (a.k.a. 9P/1867 G1, 1867 II, 9P/1873 G1, 1873 I, 1873a, 1879 III, 1879b, 9P/1967 L1, 1966 VII, 9P/1972 A1, 1972 V, 1972a, 1978 II, 1977i, 1983 XI, 1982j, 1989 I, 1987e1, 1994 XIX, 1993c)
 10P/Tempel, Comet Tempel 2 (a.k.a. 10P/1873 N1, 1873 II, 1873b, 10P/1878 O1, 1878 III, 1878b, 1894 III, 1894c, 1899 IV, 1899c, 1904 III, 1904c, 1915 I, 1915c, 1920 II, 1920a, 1925 IV, 1925d, 1930 VII, 1930f, 1946 III, 1946b, 1951 VIII, 1951d, 1957 II, 1956e, 1962 VI, 1961b, 1967 X, 1967d, 1972 X, 1972c, 1978 V, 1977d, 1983 X, 1982d, 1988 XIV, 1987g, 1994 VII)
 Any of these long-period comets:
 C/1859 G1
 C/1860 U1 (a.k.a. 1860 IV)
 C/1863 V1 (a.k.a. 1863 IV)
 C/1864 N1 (a.k.a. 1864 II)
 C/1869 T1 (a.k.a. 1869 II, 1869b)
 C/1871 L1 (a.k.a. 1871 II, 1871b)
 C/1871 V1 (a.k.a. 1871 IV, 1871e)
 C/1877 T1 (a.k.a. 1877 V, 1877f)
 A partial reference to either of these comets:
 11P/Tempel-Swift-LINEAR (a.k.a. 11P/1869 W1, 1869 III, 1869c, 11P/1880 T1, 1880 IV, 1880e, 1891 V, 1891d, 1908 II, 1908d, 11P/2001 X3)
 55P/Tempel-Tuttle (a.k.a. 55P/1366 U1, 55P/1699 U1, 1699 II, 55P/1865 Y1, 1866 I, 55P/1965 M2, 1965 IV, 1965i, 55P/1997 E1)